Nyana Kakoma is a Ugandan writer, editor, blogger, and publisher from Kampala. She created the online platform Sooo Many Stories that promotes Ugandan literature. She formerly wrote under her maiden name Hellen Nyana. She is one of the facilitators of Writivism in Kampala 2015. She took part in "Bremen & Kampala – Spaces of Transcultural Writing", a collaboration between writers from Uganda and Bremen. She is a member of Femrite. In February 2015, she was awarded an editorial fellowship at Modjaji Books by the African Writers Trust and Commonwealth Writers. A number of her articles have appeared in newspapers. She attended the Caine Prize workshop 2013, and her story "Chief Mourner" was published in the Caine Prize anthology A Memory This Size and Other Stories: The Caine Prize for African Writing 2013.

Early life and education
Nyana attended Gayaza High School for secondary education. She graduated from Makerere University with a Bachelor of Arts degree, majoring in Literature and Communication Skills.

Published works

Short stories
"Chief Mourner" in 
"Just because you didn't win"
"Fringes" in Storymoja blog, 2014
"Waiting" in The Suubi Collection (2013)

References

External links 
"Makumbi lives, breathes writing"

21st-century short story writers
21st-century Ugandan women writers
Kumusha
Living people
Makerere University alumni
People educated at Gayaza High School
Ugandan short story writers
Ugandan women short story writers
Ugandan women writers
Year of birth missing (living people)